Lichenostomus is a genus of honeyeaters endemic to Australia.

The genus formerly contained twenty species but it was split after a molecular phylogenetic analysis published in 2011 showed that the genus was polyphyletic. Former members were moved to the six new genera: Nesoptilotis, Bolemoreus, Caligavis, Stomiopera, Gavicalis and Ptilotula.

The genus contains two species:

The name Lichenostomus was introduced by the German ornithologist Jean Cabanis in 1851. The word is derived from the Greek leikhēn meaning lichen or callous and stoma meaning mouth.

References

 
Bird genera